The 2007 Big East Conference baseball tournament was held at KeySpan Park in Brooklyn, NY. This was the twenty third annual Big East Conference baseball tournament. The  won their third tournament championship and claimed the Big East Conference's automatic bid to the 2007 NCAA Division I baseball tournament.

Format and seeding 
The Big East baseball tournament was an 8 team double elimination tournament in 2007. The top eight regular season finishers were seeded one through eight based on conference winning percentage only. The field was divided into two brackets, with the winners of each bracket meeting in a single championship game.

Tournament

Jack Kaiser Award 
Todd Frazier was the winner of the 2007 Jack Kaiser Award. Frazier was a junior shortstop for Rutgers.

References 

Tournament
Big East Conference Baseball Tournament
Big East Conference baseball tournament
Big East Conference baseball tournament
2000s in Brooklyn
Baseball in New York City
College sports in New York City
Sports competitions in New York City
Sports in Brooklyn
Tourist attractions in Brooklyn